Dorcadion fuliginator is a species of beetle in the family Cerambycidae. It was described by Carl Linnaeus in his landmark 1758 10th edition of Systema Naturae. It is known from Spain, Belgium, Luxembourg (from where it is considered to be extirpated), Netherlands, Portugal, France, Germany, Austria, Lithuania, and Switzerland.

Subspecies
 Dorcadion fuliginator andianum Pic, 1917
 Dorcadion fuliginator fuliginator (Linnaeus, 1758)
 Dorcadion fuliginator loarrense Berger, 1997
 Dorcadion fuliginator meridionale Mulsant, 1839
 Dorcadion fuliginator monticola Mulsant, 1853
 Dorcadion fuliginator navarricum Mulsant, 1853
 Dorcadion fuliginator obesum Gautier, 1870
 Dorcadion fuliginator pyrenaeum Germar, 1839
 Dorcadion fuliginator striola Mulsant, 1863
 Dorcadion fuliginator urgulli Breuning, 1976

References

fuliginator
Beetles described in 1758
Taxa named by Carl Linnaeus